Vane is a surname. Notable people with the surname include:

 Charles Vane (c.1680–1721), English pirate who preyed upon English and French shipping. 
 Charles Vane-Tempest-Stewart, 6th Marquess of Londonderry (1852–1915), British Conservative politician
 Charles Vane-Tempest-Stewart, 7th Marquess of Londonderry (1878–1949), Secretary of State for Air in the 1930s
 Christopher Vane, 1st Baron Barnard (1653–1723), English peer 
 Cristina Vane, country blues singer, guitarist, banjoist and songwriter
 Edith Vane-Tempest-Stewart, Marchioness of Londonderry (1878–1959), socialite and philanthropist 
 Sir Francis Vane, Baronet, (1861–1934), founder of the Order of World Scouts
 George Vane-Tempest, 5th Marquess of Londonderry (1821–1884), Anglo-Irish aristocrat, businessman and Conservative politician
 Harry Vane, 11th Baron Barnard (born September 21, 1923), British peer, the son of Christopher Vane, 10th Baron Barnard
 Henry Vane:
Sir Henry Vane the Elder (1589–1655), English courtier, father of Henry Vane the Younger
Sir Henry Vane the Younger (1613–1662), statesman, Puritan, son of Henry Vane the Elder
Henry Vane, 1st Earl of Darlington (c. 1705–1758) (c. 1705 – 6 March 1758), an English peer, the son of Gilbert Vane, 2nd Baron Barnard
Henry Vane, 2nd Earl of Darlington (1726–1792), English peer, the son of the 1st Earl
 John Robert Vane (1927–2004), English pharmacologist
 Kathleen (Kitty) Vane (1891 - 1965), New Zealand painter 
 Mark Sutton Vane, English architectural lighting designer
 Richard Fletcher-Vane, 2nd Baron Inglewood (b. 1951), Conservative Party politician in the United Kingdom
 Robin Vane-Tempest-Stewart, 8th Marquess of Londonderry (1902–1955), Irish peer and politician
 William Vane, 1st Duke of Cleveland (1766–1842), British peer
 William Fletcher-Vane, 1st Baron Inglewood (1909–1989), British politician
 Zachary A. Vane, American politician

See also
 Ben Vane, a Scottish mountain situated in the southern Highlands
 Harriet Vane, a fictional character in the works of British writer Dorothy L. Sayers (1893–1957)

Notes